The Chamber of Deputies was the lower house of the Kingdom of Sardinia and one of the two houses of its bicameral parliament, the other being the Subalpine Senate. It became the Chamber of Deputies of the Kingdom of Italy upon the unification of Italy in 1861.

Bibliography
 Francesco Bartolotta (ed), Parlamenti e governi d'Italia dal 1848 al 1970, Roma, Vito Bianco Ed., 1971.

1848 establishments in the Kingdom of Sardinia
1861 disestablishments in Italy
Defunct lower houses
italian Parliament